Woodlands Park railway station is the junction station for the Seaford and Flinders lines. Situated in the inner south-western Adelaide suburb of Edwardstown, it is 9.1 kilometres from Adelaide station.

History 

Woodlands Park opened in 1925, and was named after the old suburb of Woodlands Park.  

Was opened on 2nd November 1925 as ‘Woodlands’ the name was from the nearby Woodlands House near the site of the present station.  The ‘Woodlands’ was named after two storeyed house built by Alfred Weaver in 1869.  After Alfred Weaver’s death, ‘Woodlands’ was bought by William Maxwell in 1891, he added a tower, gargoyle and battlement, which is like a castle shaped building built and designed by William Maxwell.  It was retained and used as Castle Motor Hotel in 1960 at South Road.  The site is now occupied by Coles Supermarket in Castle Plaza shopping centre.

The station had step down platform on what is now the outside of ‘down’ main.  The name was changed to Woodlands Park in 1934.  The single track from north of Raglan Avenue level crossing to Oaklands had it first section of welded track which was six-length during the year 1936 - 38.  This is the location of the present ‘down’ track. 

A raised island platform with concrete lining was constructed in 1954 in preparation for duplication with the 1950 type ticket office and waiting shelter.  These buildings were the same construction as for Marion, Warradale and Hove.  Double line was commenced in 1955.

Due to the number of passengers increased since the line was duplicated due to residential on the west side and light industrials on the east.  Number of passengers use this station to attend the place of employment during the weekdays.

The new manufacturing plant was constructed at Tonsley Park south of Edwardstown which require a branch line from the junction north of Ascot Park to the Chrysler Manufacturing industry.  A branch line was laid during 1965 and was opened in 1966.  Woodlands Park becomes a junction station for Marino line with the branch line to Tonsley Park.  Some passenger trains worked to Tonsley during peak hours with one service during off-peak.

Services by platform

Adelaide Metro Bus 

|}

References

External links

Railway stations in Adelaide
Railway stations in Australia opened in 1925